Freederm is a UK brand of acne and skin care medication manufactured by Diomed Developments Limited. The products include Nicotinamide as an active ingredient, which is claimed by the company to be "clinically proven to help get rid of inflamed red spots".

The brand has been heavily involved in television sponsorship in recent years, sponsoring series 11 & 12 of reality television show Big Brother and its Celebrity and Ultimate spin-offs in a reported "multi-million pound deal". It was also the sponsor for the second series of ITV dating gameshow Take Me Out, and teenage vampire drama The Vampire Diaries.

See also
 Clearasil
 Neutrogena

References

External links
Official Website

Skin care brands
Acne treatments